Ivan Franěk (born 17 June 1964), sometimes credited as Ivan Franeck, is a Czech film and television actor.

Early life and education

He was born in Plzeň, Czechoslovakia. Franěk moved to France in 1989.

Career
His first major role was appearing as Tobias in the romance drama film Brucio Nel Vento (English:  Burning in the Wind) (2002), directed Silvio Soldini. He has performed in Italian and French films and television, and has made an occasional appearance in Czech films including appearing as Karel in the drama film Tajnosti (English:  Little Girl Blue) (2007) directed by Alice Nellis.

Selected actor filmography

 Chaos (2001)
 Absolitude (2001)
 Cuore di Donna (2002)
 Vodka Lemon (2003)
 Burning in the Wind (2002) as Tobias
 Les Marins Perdus (2003)
 Sulla Mia Pelle (2003)
 36 Quai des Orfèvres (2004) as Bruno Winterstein
 Le Cri (2006)
 Premonition (2006) as Thomas Jozic
 Tajnosti (English:  Little Girl Blue) (2007) as Karel
 The Army of Crime (2009) as Feri Boczov
 Isole (2012)
 Tulpa (2012)
 La grande bellezza (2013)
 Blood of My Blood (2015)
 Chlorine (2015)
 Bloody Richard (2017)
 The Invisible Boy - Second Generation (2018)

References

External links
 

1964 births
Living people
Actors from Plzeň
Czech male film actors
Czech male television actors
Czechoslovak emigrants to France